The Cincinnati Reds were leading the National League Central division by a half game before a strike ended the 1994 Major League Baseball season.

Offseason
 November 2, 1993: Dan Wilson and Bobby Ayala were traded by the Reds to the Seattle Mariners for Bret Boone and Erik Hanson.
 November 4, 1993: Jerome Walton was signed as a free agent by the Reds.
 November 23, 1993: Steve Lake was signed as a free agent by the Reds.
 November 24, 1993: Casey Candaele was signed as a free agent by the Reds.
 March 8, 1994: Tony Fernández was signed as a free agent by the Reds.

Regular season
For the first time, the Opening Day game was moved to Sunday night as part of ESPN's Sunday Night Baseball. Up to that point, traditionally Opening Day was held on a Monday, with the Reds customarily hosting the first game of the afternoon. The move was met with some controversy, as many fans and traditionalists, including Reds owner Marge Schott, were not happy about the Sunday night game, especially since it was also Easter Sunday. Many tickets for the Sunday night game went unsold, and the team elected to wait until Monday afternoon's game for the traditional Opening Day pageantry and festivities. A sparse crowd of only 32,803 braved frigid weather Sunday night April 3 to watch the Reds lose 6–4 to the St. Louis Cardinals.

For Game 2 on Monday April 4, dubbed by most in attendance the "traditional" opening day, a sold out, standing room only crowd of 55,093 arrived at Riverfront Stadium, shrugging off the previous night's game. The pomp and ceremony, including the traditional Findlay Market parade was held under sunny skies. Kevin Mitchell hit a walk-off home run in the bottom of the 10th inning to win the game 5–4.

By Friday, August 12, the Reds had compiled a 66-48 record through 114 games (although they had actually played 115 games, since their April 6 game against the St. Louis Cardinals at Riverfront Stadium ended tied 8–8 after the top of the 6th inning due to poor weather). They were leading the NL Central Division by just half a game over the Houston Astros. Prior to the strike, they had scored 609 runs (5.30 per game) and had allowed 490 runs (4.26 per game).

Game log

|-
| 1 || April 3 || Cardinals
|-
| 2 || April 4 || Cardinals
|-
| 3 || April 6 || Cardinals
|-
| 4 || April 8 || Phillies
|-
| 5 || April 9 || Phillies
|-
| 6 || April 10 || Phillies
|-  style="text-align:center; background:#bfb;"
| 7 || April 11 || @ Expos || 9-4 (11 inn.) || Carrasco (3-0) || Heredia (0-1) || || 12,526 || 5-1-1 || Boxscore
|-  style="text-align:center; background:#bfb;"
| 8 || April 12 || @ Expos || 7-1 || Pugh (1-0) || Boucher (0-1) || || 12,466 || 6-1-1 || Boxscore
|-  style="text-align:center; background:#fbb;"
| 9 || April 13 || @ Expos || 2-3 || Wetteland (1-1) || McElroy (0-1) || || 14,072 || 6-2-1 || Boxscore
|-
| 10 || April 15 || @ Phillies
|-
| 11 || April 16 || @ Phillies
|-
| 12 || April 17 || @ Phillies
|-
| 13 || April 19 || Pirates
|-
| 14 || April 20 || Pirates
|-
| 15 || April 22 || Marlins
|-
| 16 || April 23 || Marlins
|-
| 17 || April 24 || Marlins
|-
| 18 || April 25 || Cubs
|-
| 19 || April 26 || Cubs
|-
| 20 || April 27 || @ Pirates
|-
| 21 || April 28 || @ Pirates
|-
| 22 || April 29 || @ Marlins
|-
| 23 || April 30 || @ Marlins
|-

|-
| 24 || May 1 || @ Marlins
|-
| 25 || May 2 || @ Cubs
|-
| 26 || May 3 || @ Cubs
|-
| 27 || May 4 || @ Cubs
|-
| 28 || May 5 || Astros
|-
| 29 || May 6 || Astros
|-
| 30 || May 7 || Astros
|-
| 31 || May 8 || Astros
|-
| 32 || May 9 || @ Padres
|-
| 33 || May 10 || @ Padres
|-
| 34 || May 11 || @ Padres
|-
| 35 || May 13 || @ Giants
|-
| 36 || May 14 || @ Giants
|-
| 37 || May 15 || @ Giants
|-
| 38 || May 17 || Braves
|-
| 39 || May 18 || Braves
|-
| 40 || May 19 || Braves
|-
| 41 || May 20 || Dodgers
|-
| 42 || May 21 || Dodgers
|-
| 43 || May 22 || Dodgers
|-
| 44 || May 23 || @ Rockies
|-
| 45 || May 24 || @ Rockies
|-
| 46 || May 25 || @ Rockies
|-
| 47 || May 26 || @ Rockies
|-
| 48 || May 27 || @ Mets
|-
| 49 || May 28 || @ Mets
|-
| 50 || May 29 || @ Mets
|-  style="text-align:center; background:#bfb;"
| 51 || May 30 || Expos || 7-3 || Rijo (3-3) || Hill (8-3) || || 27,875 || 28-22-1 || Boxscore
|-  style="text-align:center; background:#bfb;"
| 52 || May 31 || Expos || 5-4 (13 inn.) || Schourek (3-0) || Shaw (2-2) || || 25,046 || 29-22-1 || Boxscore
|-

|-  style="text-align:center; background:#fbb;"
| 53 || June 1 || Expos || 9-10 || Scott (3-2) || Carrasco (3-2) || Martínez (1) || 23,653 || 29-23-1 || Boxscore
|-
| 54 || June 3 || Mets
|-
| 55 || June 4 || Mets
|-
| 56 || June 5 || Mets
|-
| 57 || June 7 || @ Cardinals
|-
| 58 || June 8 || @ Cardinals
|-
| 59 || June 9 || Rockies
|-
| 60 || June 10 || Rockies
|-
| 61 || June 11 || Rockies
|-
| 62 || June 12 || Rockies
|-
| 63 || June 13 || @ Dodgers
|-
| 64 || June 14 || @ Dodgers
|-
| 65 || June 15 || @ Dodgers
|-
| 66 || June 17 || @ Braves
|-
| 67 || June 18 || @ Braves
|-
| 68 || June 19 || @ Braves
|-
| 69 || June 21 || Giants
|-
| 70 || June 22 || Giants
|-
| 71 || June 23 || Giants
|-
| 72 || June 24 || Padres
|-
| 73 || June 25 || Padres
|-
| 74 || June 26 || Padres
|-
| 75 || June 27 || @ Astros
|-
| 76 || June 28 || @ Astros
|-
| 77 || June 29 || @ Astros
|-
| 78 || June 30 || @ Pirates
|-

|-
| 79 || July 1 || @ Pirates
|-
| 80 || July 2 || @ Pirates
|-
| 81 || July 3 || @ Pirates
|-
| 82 || July 4 || @ Marlins
|-
| 83 || July 5 || @ Marlins
|-
| 84 || July 6 || @ Marlins
|-
| 85 || July 7 || Pirates
|-
| 86 || July 8 || Pirates
|-
| 87 || July 9 || Pirates
|-
| 88 || July 10 || Pirates
|-  style="text-align:center; background:#bbcaff;"
|align="center" colspan="10"|All-Star Break: NL def. AL at Three Rivers Stadium, 8–7 (10)
|-
| 89 || July 14 || Cubs
|-
| 90 || July 15 || Cubs
|-
| 91 || July 16 || Cubs
|-
| 92 || July 17 || Cubs
|-
| 93 || July 18 || Marlins
|-
| 94 || July 19 || Marlins
|-
| 95 || July 20 || Marlins
|-
| 96 || July 22 || @ Cubs
|-
| 97 || July 23 || @ Cubs
|-
| 98 || July 24 || @ Cubs
|-
| 99 || July 25 || Astros
|-
| 100 || July 26 || Astros
|-
| 101 || July 27 || Astros
|-
| 102 || July 28 || @ Padres
|-
| 103 || July 29 || @ Padres
|-
| 104 || July 30 || @ Padres
|-
| 105 || July 31 || @ Padres
|-

|-
| 106 || August 1 || @ Giants
|-
| 107 || August 2 || @ Giants
|-
| 108 || August 3 || @ Giants
|-
| 109 || August 5 || Braves
|-
| 110 || August 6 || Braves
|-
| 111 || August 7 || Braves
|-
| 112 || August 8 || Braves
|-
| 113 || August 9 || Dodgers
|-
| 114 || August 10 || Dodgers
|-
| 115 || August 11 || Dodgers
|-

Season standings

Record vs. opponents

Notable transactions
 May 27, 1994: Kevin Maas was signed as a free agent by the Reds.
 May 29, 1994: Roberto Kelly and Roger Etheridge (minors) were traded by the Reds to the Atlanta Braves for Deion Sanders.

Roster

Player stats

Batting

Starters by position
Note: Pos = Position; G = Games played; AB = At bats; H = Hits; Avg. = Batting average; HR = Home runs; RBI = Runs batted in

Other batters
Note: G = Games played; AB = At bats; H = Hits; Avg. = Batting average; HR = Home runs; RBI = Runs batted in

Pitching

Starting pitchers
Note: G = Games pitched; IP = Innings pitched; W = Wins; L = Losses; ERA = Earned run average; SO = Strikeouts

Other pitchers
Note: G = Games pitched; IP = Innings pitched; W = Wins; L = Losses; ERA = Earned run average; SO = Strikeouts

Relief pitchers
Note: G = Games pitched; W = Wins; L = Losses; SV = Saves; ERA = Earned run average; SO = Strikeouts

Farm system 

LEAGUE CHAMPIONS: Indianapolis, Princeton, Billings

References

1994 Cincinnati Reds season at Baseball Reference
1994 Cincinnati Reds season at Baseball Almanac

Cincinnati Reds season
Cincinnati Reds seasons
Cinc